Egoitz Jaio Gabiola (born 13 August 1980) is a Spanish retired footballer who played as a central defender.

Club career
Born in Abadiño, Biscay, Jaio spent his first professional years with Athletic Bilbao, but never made it past the reserves of the Basque Country giants, in Segunda División B. He resumed his career in Segunda División, consecutively with Racing de Ferrol (twice), Algeciras CF and Gimnàstic de Tarragona; as a starter with the latter club, he achieved promotion to La Liga in 2006.

That summer, Jaio moved teams also in the second division, joining CD Numancia and being regularly used during his stint. Aged almost 29, he made his top level debut in a 2–0 home win against Málaga CF on 2 May 2009 (he appeared precisely in the last five rounds, as the Sorians were already relegated).

References

External links

1980 births
Living people
People from Abadiño
Spanish footballers
Footballers from the Basque Country (autonomous community)
Association football defenders
La Liga players
Segunda División players
Segunda División B players
Tercera División players
CD Basconia footballers
Bilbao Athletic footballers
Athletic Bilbao footballers
Racing de Ferrol footballers
Algeciras CF footballers
Gimnàstic de Tarragona footballers
CD Numancia players
Sestao River footballers
Austrian Football Bundesliga players
FC Wacker Innsbruck (2002) players
Spanish expatriate footballers
Expatriate footballers in Austria
Spanish expatriate sportspeople in Austria
Sportspeople from Biscay